Manchester Traincare Centre could refer to:

Longsight Electric TMD, electric railway vehicle depot, sometimes referred to as Alstom Traincare Centre
Ardwick rail depot, Manchester; depot for Siemens multiple units
Manchester International Depot, originally built for regional Eurostar trains